Miriam is a 1957 Finnish drama film directed by William Markus. It was entered into the 8th Berlin International Film Festival.

Cast
 Anneli Sauli as Miriam
 Irma Seikkula as Britta Allnes
 Pentti Siimes as Hans Allnes
 Leo Riuttu as Torvald Allnes
 Yrjö Aaltonen as Boy
 Paavo Hukkinen as Man at the station
 Heimo Karppinen as Man at the station
 Veikko Kines as Shopkeeper
 Aino Lehtimäki as Pharmaceut
 Kaisu Leppänen as Aunt Anta
 Jaakko Maakorpi as Horse Driver
 Liisi Palteisto as Miriam as Child
 Yrjö Saari as Doctor
 Enok Sikiö as Man in the train
 Maininki Sippola as Woman in the party (as Maininki Sippola-Wilska)

References

External links

1957 films
1957 drama films
Finnish drama films
1950s Finnish-language films
Finnish black-and-white films
Films directed by William Markus